Kovarce ( or) is a municipality in the Topoľčany District of the Nitra Region, Slovakia. In 2011 it had 1581 inhabitants.

History

Kovarce dates back at least to the late 13th century, in the Hungarian Kingdom, when it was the property of the Ludanick family. It was seized by Matthew III Csák during the troubles of the early 14th century. In 1395, it became property of the Apponyi family. It fell to Turkish attacks in 1530, 1599 and 1663. In 1663–1685, a period of Ottoman rule between the fourth Austro-Turkish war and the War of the Holy League, it was part of the Uyvar Province as an administrative unit of the Nahiye of Nitra.

In 1864 a sugar refinery was built in the village. A daughter of the sugar refinery's founder, Anton Wels, was the maternal grandmother of Audrey Hepburn.

Points of interest

The former castle stands in the midst of the village. The Wels family purchased it from its last aristocratic owners and remodeled it by building a second floor, then sold it to the Apponyi family after the death of Anton Wels in 1876. The Apponyis appear not to have lived there but rented it, to the local Rosenthal brothers until 1906. From 1906 the castle was rented to American businessman (and in 1912 Titanic survivor) Thomas Cardeza, a grandson of the founder of Fidelity Trust Company in Philadelphia, and his French-born wife Mary (née Racine and descendant of Jean Racine), both of whom had lived between 1903 and 1906 in nearby Nitrianska Streda. The Cardezas also made transformations, including building the southern wing's second floor, and kept a small zoo including bears and monkeys in the castle's garden. They left Kovarce after the American entry into World War I in April 1917, but kept renting the property until 1920. In late 1926, Count Henrik Apponyi sold it to the Czechoslovak Government which transformed it into an institution for war invalids. In 1953, it became an institution for mentally ill patients, which it still is under the name "Clementia".

Another mansion in the village, initially built in the 18th century, is now privately owned.

Saint Nicholas Church, in the center of the village, dates back to the 18th century.

Saint Anne Church, on a hill dominating the village, was built in the 19th century in the neo-Gothic style.

See also
 List of municipalities and towns in Slovakia

References

Genealogical resources

The records for genealogical research are available at the state archive "Statny Archiv in Nitra, Slovakia"

 Roman Catholic church records (births/marriages/deaths): 1698-1932 (parish A)

External links
http://en.e-obce.sk/obec/kovarce/kovarce.html
Official homepage
Surnames of living people in Kovarce

Villages and municipalities in Topoľčany District